Eva García Sempere (born 28 March 1976) is a Spanish communist politician and member of the Congress of Deputies during the 12th and 13th legislatures.

She is a member of the United Left/The Greens–Assembly for Andalusia and the Communist Party of Andalusia.

References

External links 

Living people
1976 births
Members of the 12th Congress of Deputies (Spain)
Members of the 13th Congress of Deputies (Spain)
Communist Party of Spain politicians
United Left (Spain) politicians
Spanish women in politics